Australian National University Students' Association is the students' union of the Australian National University (ANU). It is better known by its acronym, ANUSA. ANUSA acts as a representative body for the undergraduate students of the Australian National University, while also providing a number of goods and services to those students.

Not to be confused with ANU Union, a not-for-profit association that once managed retail operations in the former ANU Union Building.

The Postgraduate and Research Students' Association acts in an equal capacity to ANUSA at the Australian National University as a representative body for graduate students.

Objective 
The objectives of the Australian National University Student Association are: 
 To promote the welfare of, and further the interests of, undergraduate students
 To work for quality and equity in higher education
 To afford a recognised means of representation for undergraduate students within the university and the wider community
 To foster community, equity and diversity within the university

As a recipient of a student services and amenities fee, the ANU utilizes ANUSA under its formal process of student consultation as required by the Student Services, Amenities, Representation and Advocacy Guidelines (Representation Guidelines).

History

Key events

"Wadgate"
The 1996 ANUSA elections saw the losing "Rage" ticket embroiled in scandal. 146 votes for the "Rage" presidential candidate Daniel Jenkins were excluded by the Returning Officer after allegations of ballot stuffing. The fraud was discovered when a student sitting in a cafe saw a voter attempt to stuff a wad of ballots into the ballot box. When the Returning Officer opened the ballot box, five wads of ballots were found, all of which gave their first preference to Jenkins.

The scandal was dubbed "Wadgate" by the student newspaper Woroni and was subsequently reported on the front page of the Canberra Times (5 February 1997) and elsewhere.  It was also raised at least three times in the Australian Senate by Sen. Eric Abetz (Senate Hansard: 30/10/96, pp. 4747–4750; 05/02/97, pp. 125–127; and 23/06/97, pp. 4929–31).

The winning presidential candidate, Matt Tinning from the "Counter Attack" ticket, secured enough votes to win even if fraudulent votes had not been excluded.

Facilities and services 
ANUSA moved into premises in the Concessions Building in Union Court in 1999, following a major refurbishment. The Brian Kenyon Student Space was opened in 2011, named after Brian Kenyon, who drove ANU's late night bus for 26 years until 2014.

As part of the Union Court redevelopment, the Concessions Building was demolished in 2017. ANUSA and the Brian Kenyon Student Space are now located in the Di Riddell Student Centre.

Recent history

Independence of Woroni 
In 2011, ANUSA was incorporated under the Associations Incorporation Act 1991 (ACT). The ANU Student Newspaper, Woroni, was previously published by ANUSA, however, the successful 2009 Stand Up! ticket ran on a platform to deliver an independent student newspaper, similar to student publications at North American universities. As a result, ANU Student Media was formed in 2010 as an independent association, and became incorporated in 2012.

Student Services and Amenities Fee introduction 
2012 saw the introduction of the Student Services and Amenities Fee by the Gillard Government, leading to a doubling of the ANUSA budget. This was a catalyst for a new phase of growth for the Association, most apparent in the significant increase in staffing that has occurred.

Campaigns 
Key campaigns in recent years have included 'Save the School of Music' in 2012, an attempt to prevent structural changes to ANU School of Music proposed by the university. The campaign attracted national media attention, and was featured on the ABC's 7:30 Report. A petition was signed by over 24,000 people. In 2014, an anti-fee deregulation campaign was spearheaded by Education Officer Laura Wey, also achieving national media coverage. One of the protest marches was comically featured on Channel 9's The Footy Show. In 2017, the 'Month of Strength and Solidarity' campaign was conducted in order to advocate for the changes regarding sexual assault and harassment on campus.

List of presidents of the students' association 

The following students served as President of the ANU Students' Association

 1962 Don Brewster 
 1963 Chris Higgins
 1964 Tony Hartnell
 1965 John Yocklunn, Peter Paterson
 1966 Keith Baker – SRC/ John Yocklunn – ANUSA 
 1967 Alan Brooks
 1968 Alan Brooks
 1969 Bob Erwin
 1970 Mark Cunliffe 
 1971 Michael Wright
 1972 Richard Refshauge
 1973    
 1974 Michael Dunn
 1975 Julius Roe
 1976 Liz O'Brien
 1977 Jon Nicholson
 1978 Peter Cardwell
 1979 Stephen Bartos
 1980 Louise Tarrant
 1981 Jeffrey Dalton 
 1982 Gary Humphries 
 1983 Bill Redpath
 1984 Peter Taylor
 1985 Lesley Ward
 1986 Neil McFarlane
 1987    
 1988 Andrew Major 
 1989    
 1990 Jon Coroneos
 1991 Elizabeth O'Leary
 1992 Amanda Chadwick
 1993 Kath Cummins
 1994 Caitlin Wyndham
 1995 Hamish McPherson, Craig Cook, Pip Bolding
 1996 William Mackerras
 1997 Matt Tinning
 1998 Harry Greenwell
 1999 Helen Stitt
 2000 Russell Egan
 2001 Maciej Wasilewicz
 2002 Joanne Yin
 2003 Steve Michelson
 2004 Max Jeganathan
 2005 Aparna Rao
 2006 Laura Crespo
 2007 Claudia Newman-Martin
 2008 Jamila Rizvi
 2009 Sham Sara
 2010 Tully Fletcher
 2011 Leah Ginnivan
 2012 Fleur Hawes, resigned, Dallas Proctor
 2013 Aleks Sladojevic
 2014 Cameron Wilson
 2015 Ben Gill
 2016 Ben Gill
 2017 James Connolly
 2018 Eleanor Kay
 2019 Eden Lim
 2020 Lachlan Day
 2021 Madhumitha Janagaraja
 2022 Christian Flynn
 2023 Ben Yates

Structure

Membership 
ANUSA is an association of ANU's more than 10,000 undergraduate students. There is only a single class of membership. A person is a member of ANUSA provided that they:
 Are a currently enrolled Undergraduate Student at the Australian National University; or
 Are a student enrolled in an ANU Pathway Program (including ANU College and ANU Preparatory Program), and 
 Have not written to the General Secretary of the Association specifically stating that they do not wish to be a member of the Association
The provision to opt out of membership is rarely exercised.

Finances 
ANUSA is financed by a block grant from the university, using revenue collected from the Student Services and Amenities Fee (SSAF). In 2016 ANUSA was allocated $1,681,535 by the university, or 32.6% of the total SSAF revenue collected.

Governance 
ANUSA is led by a 39-member Student Representative Council, which includes a 7-member Executive, 7 Department Officers, 12 College Representatives and 14 General Representatives. Also elected are the Undergraduate Representative to ANU Council and 5 delegates to the National Union of Students Conference. The day-to-day operations of the Association are managed by approximately 13 paid staff members.

Executive 
 President
 Vice-President
 General Secretary
 Education Officer
 Treasurer
 Clubs Officer
 Welfare Officer

College representatives 
 College of Arts & Social Sciences Representative (*2)
 College of Asia & the Pacific Representative (*2)
 College of Engineering & Computer Sciences Representative (*2)
 College of Sciences Representative (*2)
 College of Law Representative (*2)
 College of Business & Economics Representative (*2)

Department officers 
 Disabilities Officer
 Environment Officer
 International Students' Officer
 Queer* Officer
 Women's Officer
 Indigenous Officer
 BIPOC Officer

Departments 
The ANUSA Constitution establishes and funds seven autonomous departments to represent and advocate for students from marginalised groups in the community. These include:
 Disabilities Department (also known as ANU Disabilities Students Association)
 Environment Department (also known as ANU Environment Collective)
 International Students' Department (ISD)
 Queer* Department (also known as ANU Queer* Collective)
 Women's Department (also known as ANU Women's Collective)
 Bla(c)k, Indigenous and People of Colour Department (BIPOC Department)
 Indigenous Department (also known as ANU Indigenous Department)

Committees 
The ANUSA Constitution establishes a number of committees with various purposes:
 Education Committee, chaired by the Education Officer
 Social Committee
 Mental Health Committee
 Safety on Campus Committee
 Disputes Committee
 Financial Review Committee

Services

Student Assistance Team 
The Student Assistance Team provides support, advice and assistance to students in a range of areas, including: Centrelink payments; welfare; support for victims of sexual assault; bursaries and scholarships and academic appeals. They also assist with referrals. The Student Assistance Team is staffed by 2 Student Assistance Advisors.

The Team also administers several grants schemes, which provide meals, grants and grocery vouchers to students facing financial difficulty.

Legal service 
The ANUSA lawyer offers free and confidential legal advice.

Social programme 
ANUSA's Social Committee coordinates a lively programme of social events throughout the year, including Orientation Week, Bush Week, Sex & Consent Week and Universal Lunch Hour each Thursday. Each year, ANUSA hosts an open air concert on the final day of Orientation Week, which has attracted acts including The Presets, Kimbra, Miami Horror, Rüfüs Du Sol, Bluejuice and British India.

Student advocacy

Student representation 
ANUSA represents ANU undergraduate students on a number of high-level University committees, including:
 University Council
 Academic Board
 University Education Committee
 Student Experience Committee
The ANUSA President meets regularly with the University Executive to discuss issues pertaining to the welfare of undergraduate students.

Political affiliations 
ANUSA is somewhat unusual among Australian student unions in that its Executive has remained independent of any political party since 2011.

Whilst ANUSA is affiliated with the National Union of Students (NUS), it did not pay accreditation fees in 2016 due to concerns about the efficacy of NUS and issues relating to student wellbeing at the NUS National Conference. This resulted in its voting rights being suspended at the NUS National Conference that year. In 2017, the body reaccredited to the NUS, however failed to accredit in 2018 again after the NUS did not meet a number of Key Performance Indicators (KPIs) passed by the ANUSA SRC.

References

External links
ANUSA Website
Woroni Undergraduate Newspaper

Australian National University